Beijing Sub-Center railway station, also known as Beijing Chengshi Fuzhongxin railway station, is a railway station in Tongyun Subdistrict, Tongzhou District, Beijing. It is expected to open in late 2024. It will be the largest underground railway station in Asia.

The total investment of the Integrated Transport Hub is approximately 42.1 billion Renminbi.

This station and the ITH are designed by AREP, Beijing General Municipal Engineering Design & Research Institute, China Railway Design Corporation, and China Architecture Design Group.

See also 
 Beijing–Tangshan intercity railway
 Beijing–Binhai intercity railway

References 

Railway stations under construction in China
Stations on the Beijing–Tangshan Intercity Railway
Stations on the Beijing–Binhai Intercity Railway
Stations on the Intercity Railway Connector